Căşeiu is a commune in Cluj County, Transylvania, Romania. It is composed of ten villages: Cășeiu, Comorâța, Coplean (Kapjon), Custura (Dumbráva), Gârbău Dejului (Désorbó), Guga (Guga), Leurda (Leurda határrész), Rugășești (Felsőkosály), Sălătruc (Szeletruk) and Urișor (Alőr).

Demographics 
According to the census from 2002 there was a total population of 4,882 people living in this commune. Of this population, 94.44% are ethnic Romanians, 4.67% ethnic Romani and 0.83% are ethnic Hungarians

Natives
Ioan Rus

References

Communes in Cluj County
Localities in Transylvania